The 2015 Houston Dynamo season was the club's tenth season of existence, and their first under new head coach Owen Coyle.

Background

Review

Roster

Current roster 
As of August 17, 2015.

Transfers

In

Out

Loan in

Loan out

Competitions

Preseason

MLS

Schedule

Standings

Western Conference Table

Overall Table

U.S. Open Cup 

Houston will enter the 2015 U.S. Open Cup with the rest of Major League Soccer in the fourth round.

Friendlies

Statistical Leaders

Uniforms

Television
For the 2015 season, Root Sports Southwest serves as the English broadcaster of all 22 non-national Major League Soccer matches. The one-year deal with ROOT SPORTS' regional network includes a 30-minute pregame and postgame show for each game. Games and weekly programing had aired the previous two seasons on Comcast SportsNet Houston, which was purchased out of bankruptcy court by DirecTV and AT&T in October 2014 and rebranded as Root Sports Southwest.

Root Sports initially cancelled the three-year deal signed in 2013 with CSN Houston before agreeing on this new deal with the Dynamo. In comparison, the Dynamo lose airtime by way of a weekly show and daily coverage on CSN's daily newscast but gained a higher distribution to homes in Houston that weren't subscribed to Comcast and therefore did not have access to Comcast's exclusive sports network.

On the Spanish side, Telemundo Houston returns as the Dynamo's broadcast partner for the second consecutive season. The Telemundo-owned Houston station signed up for 10 Dynamo games in 2015, a three-game increase from the 2014 season. Five of those matches will air live on TeleXitos, available over-the-air on KTMD's secondary channel 47.2, and select games on TeleXitos include a 30-minute pregame and a 30-minute postgame show. Games on Telemundo, channel 47.1, air deferred at 11 p.m. on the night of the match due to scheduling conflicts with national programming (of which includes Telemundo's home games telecast of Liga MX sides León and Pachuca).

The remaining 12 games of the regular-season will be carried by MLS' national TV partners, including 8 on the Univision family of networks, which shows the Dynamo's appeal to a national Hispanic audience due to its Honduran trio (Boniek, Garrido and López) and the addition of Mexican international Erick Torres.

See also 
 Houston Dynamo
 2015 in American soccer
 2015 Major League Soccer season

References 

Houston Dynamo FC seasons
Houston Dynamo
Houston Dynamo
Houston Dyamo